The Liujiaxia Dam is a major hydroelectric dam on the upper Yellow River, in Linxia Hui Autonomous Prefecture of China's Gansu Province. The dam and its hydroelectric facility (Liujiaxia Hydroelectric Station) are located in Liujia Gorge, or Liujiaxia, just downstream from where the Tao River flows into the Yellow River. The site is on the eastern outskirts of Liujiaxia Town. Since Liujiaxia Town is the county seat of Yongjing County, it is often marked on less detailed maps simply as "Yongjing".

The Liujiaxia Reservoir formed by the dam is the largest body of water within Gansu. The primary purpose of the dam is generating electricity; in addition, it is used for flood control, irrigation, and "ice flood prevention".

The power plant has 5 generators with the total installed capacity of 1,225 MW. When it became fully operational in 1974, it became the country's largest hydroelectric power plant, and remained so until the 1980s.

History 

In 1955, just a few years after the creation of the People's Republic of China, the Communist government announced  a large-scale program of hydroelectric dam construction on the Yellow River. According to the plan, a dam was to be built in each of the Three Gorges of the Yellow River: Liujia Gorge, Yanguo Gorge, and Bapan Gorge. The detailed geological investigation of the area, to choose the most suitable site for the dams, started immediately.

In 1958 construction work started on the first two dams, both located in Linxia Hui Autonomous Prefecture's Yongjing County: the 57-meter high Yanguoxia Dam (in Yangou Gorge, downstream from Liujiaxia) and the 147-meter high Liujiaxia Dam in Liujia Gorge. While the smaller  Yanguoxia Dam was completed in 1961, the work on Liujiaxia Dam itself was suspended in 1961-63, and the dam itself was only completed in 1969. The five generators were brought into service, one after another, between 1969 and 1974.

Hu Jintao, then a young engineer, joined the project's staff in 1968. Guo Moruo visited the site in 1971 and wrote a poem on the occasion.

The reservoirs created by the three-dam cascade (also including  Bapanxia Dam (1968-1975) farther downstream) displaced a large number of local farmers. The three reservoirs flooded 118,229 (7,881 hectares) of farmland and displaced 43,829 residents, primarily in Yongjing County. The compensation payments to the farmers affected by the Liujiaxia Dams reportedly averaged 364 yuan per person (but in reality may have been even lower), and were grossly inadequate. It is said that the residents received lower compensation amount than they could otherwise because in 1958, during the Great Leap Forward, when the Yanguoxia project started, they understated the value of their assets, as they were afraid to be classified as "rich peasants", i.e. class enemies.

See also 

 List of power stations in China

References 

Dams in China
Buildings and structures in Gansu
Hydroelectric power stations in Gansu
Dams on the Yellow River
Linxia Hui Autonomous Prefecture
Dams completed in 1969